Södertörn Marine Regiment (designation SMR, was a Swedish Navy coastal artillery unit which operated from 1956 to 2000. The unit was based on Järflotta south of Nynäshamn.

History
Södertörn Marine Regiment was raised in 1956 as the 3rd Coastal Artillery Brigade (Tredje kustartilleribrigaden, KAB 3). The brigade was then in the peace organization under the Vaxholm Coastal Artillery Regiment (KA 1), but was an independent unit in the war organization. The brigade consisted initially in the war organization of a staff at Järflotta and three barrier battalions (spärrbataljoner), Ornö, Mellsten, and Askö. On 1 July 1994, the brigade was also separated from the regiment in the peace organization and reorganized into the Södertörn Marine Brigade (Södertörns marinbrigad, SMB).

The Södertörn Group (Södertörnsgruppen) was raised on 1 July 1994 as the Södertörn Marine Brigade (SMB), along with Roslagen Marine Brigade (RMB), and as a result of that the East Coast Naval Command (MKO) was formed in 1990. This as a continuation of the integration of marine units on the lower level, including the coastal artillery brigades reorganized into marine brigades. With this, among other things, the Swedish Navy's base units and the coastal artillery's brigade service units were merged, and came to be part of the marine brigades.

On 1 January 1998, the war organization within the coastal artillery was reduced, whereby Södertörn Marine Brigade was reduced to a regiment, and got the new name Södertörn Marine Regiment (Södertörns marinregemente, SMR). The regiment was disbanded on 30 June 2000 in connection with the Defence Act of 2000.

Units

3rd Coastal Artillery Brigade (1956)
Staff at Järflotta
Barrier Battalion Ornö, with staff at Bodskär
1x 10.5/50 battery
3x light batteries
2x mine obstacle units
Barrier Battalion Mellsten, with staff at Nåttarö
1x 10,5/50 batteri
4x light batteries
3x mine obstacle units
Barrier Battalion Askö, with staff at Torö
1x heavy battery
2x light batteries
1x mine obstacle unit
2x mobile 10.5/42 batteries
2x AA companies for protection of the Södertörn Base (Södertörnsbasen, SörB)
3x bicycle infantry battalions of the Stockholm Defence District (Fo 44)
3rd Archipelago Battalion of the Home Guard

3rd Coastal Artillery Brigade (1984)
Staff at Järflotta
Barrier Battalion Ornö, with staff at Bodskär
1x heavy battery
1x light battery
2x mine obstacle units
Barrier Battalion Mellsten, with staff at Nåttarö
1x heavy battery
1x light battery
3x mine obstacle units
Barrier Battalion Askö, with staff at Torö
1x heavy 12/70 battery
1x light battery
1x mine obstacle unit
Coastal Ranger Company
3x bicycle infantry battalion of the Stockholm Defence District (Fo 44)
1x division engineer company
defence district service company
security companies

Södertörn Marine Brigade
Staff at Järflotta
Coastal Defence Battalion 
Coastal Defence Battalion Mellsten
2nd Amphibian Battalion
Marine Service Battalion Södertörn
2x defence district battalions of the Stockholm Defence District (Fo 44)
Defence district engineer company, security companies and Home Guard units

Södertörn Marine Regiment
Staff at Järflotta
2nd Amphibian Battalion
Marine Service Battalion Södertörn
2x defence district battalions of the Stockholm Defence District (Fo 44)
Defence district engineer company, security companies and Home Guard units

Heraldry and traditions

Coat of arms
The coat of arms of the Södertörn Marine Brigade (SMB) 1994–1997 and Södertörn Marine Regiment (SMR) 1997–2000. Blazon: "Per pale or the provincial badge of Södermanland, a griffon segreant sableand azure an anchor surmounted two gunbarrels of older pattern in saltire, all or".

Heritage
On 1 July 2000, the Södertörn Group (Södertörnsgruppen) was raised, consisting of two battalions, Södertörn Home Guard Battalion and Roslagen Home Guard Battalion. Södertörn Home Guard Battalion was the traditional keeper of the Södertörn Marine Brigade. In 2017 (or 2018), the traditions were transferred to the Södertörn Group, this after the decision that the Home Guard battalions should bear the insignia of the 1st Marine Regiment (Amf 1) as a unit insignia. The regiment's march was inherited by the Södertörn Group, which also took over the heraldic weapon, with the difference that the weapon was laid over two crossed swords.

Commanding officers
1956–1994: ?
1994–1995: COL Håkan Beskow
1996–2000: ?

Names, designations and locations

See also
Roslagen Marine Regiment
Vaxholm Coastal Artillery Regiment

Footnotes

References

Notes

Print

Web

Further reading

Regiments of the Swedish Amphibious Corps
Military units and formations established in 1956
Military units and formations disestablished in 2000
1956 establishments in Sweden
2000 disestablishments in Sweden
Vaxholm Garrison